Ashinaga longimana is a moth of the family Oecophoridae. It is found in Taiwan.

The wingspan is about 40 mm. The forewings are dark brown, with two broad, fuscous stripes running from the base to before the termen. The hindwings are somewhat paler than the forewings and the veins are darker. They have extraordinary long hind legs.

References

Moths described in 1929
Oecophorinae